The following lists events that happened during 1871 in South Africa.

Incumbents
 Governor of the Cape of Good Hope and High Commissioner for Southern Africa: Sir Henry Barkly.
 Lieutenant-governor of the Colony of Natal: Robert William Keate.
 State President of the Orange Free State: Jan Brand.
 State President of the South African Republic:
 Marthinus Wessel Pretorius (until 20 November).
 Daniel Jacobus Erasmus (acting from 21 November).

Events
October
 27 – British forces march into the Klipdrift Republic and annex the territory as Griqualand West Colony.

November
 21 – Daniel Jacobus Erasmus becomes acting State President of the South African Republic.

Unknown date
 Gold is discovered at Pilgrim's Creek in the Pilgrim's Rest area.
 When an  diamond is discovered, a diamond rush results and the town of New Rush springs up.

Births
 9 January – Eugène Marais, lawyer, naturalist, poet and writer. (d. 1936)
 7 April – Charlotte Maxeke, religious leader, social worker and political activist. (d. 1939)

Deaths
 4 October – Sarel Cilliers, Voortrekker leader and preacher. (b. 1801)

Railways

Railway lines opened

 18 February – Namaqualand – Port Nolloth to Muishondfontein, .

Locomotives
 Two  gauge 0-6-0 tank locomotives are placed in service by the Cape of Good Hope Copper Mining Company, the first steam locomotives to enter service on the hitherto mule-powered Namaqualand Railway between Port Nolloth and the Namaqualand copper mines around O'okiep in the Cape Colony.

References

South Africa
Years in South Africa
History of South Africa